Yfoundations is a peak body organisation of youth homelessness services in New South Wales, Australia. For over 40 years, Yfoundations has served as the NSW peak body representing children and young people at risk of and experiencing homelessness, as well as the services that provide direct support to them.

We aim to create a future without youth homelessness by providing a voice for young people experiencing and at risk of homelessness. We work collaboratively with service providers, NGOs, government departments and community members to provide research, sector development and policy advice, health projects and services for young people.

Founding
Yfoundations was founded in 1979 by eighteen youth homelessness services in New South Wales. The organisation was initially called Youth Refuge Action Group (YRAG), and changed its name several times over the years, including YRA, YRAA, YAA, and presently, Yfoundations. The organisation's founding members include Caretakers Cottage, Taldumande Youth Services, and Young People's Refuge, the first of the NSW youth refuges.

People
 Pam Barker - CEO

See also
 Homelessness in Australia
 Youth Homelessness Matters Day
 Homelessness NSW

References

External links
Yfoundations official website

Homelessness in Australia
Homelessness organizations
Advocacy groups in Australia